James Anderson Mitchell (26 November 1920 – 14 October 1996) was an Australian rules footballer who played with Melbourne in the Victorian Football League (VFL).

Prior to playing for Melbourne, Mitchell served in the Australian Army for five years during World War II.

Notes

External links 

1920 births
1996 deaths
Australian rules footballers from Melbourne
Melbourne Football Club players
University Blacks Football Club players
People from Malvern, Victoria
Military personnel from Melbourne
Australian Army personnel of World War II